Category 5 South Pacific severe tropical cyclones are tropical cyclones that reach Category 5 intensity on the Australian tropical cyclone intensity scale within the South Pacific basin. They are by definition the strongest tropical cyclones that can form on Earth. A total of 21 tropical cyclones have peaked at Category 5 strength in the South Pacific tropical cyclone basin, which is denoted as the part of the Pacific Ocean to the south of the equator and to the east of 160°E. 20 of these tropical cyclones have been classified as Category 5 on the Australian tropical cyclone intensity scale, while Severe Tropical Cyclone Anne was estimated to be equivalent to a Category 5 on the Saffir–Simpson hurricane wind scale.

The earliest tropical cyclone to be classified as a Category 5 severe tropical cyclone was Hina, which was classified as a Category 5 between March 6 - 7, 1985, as it moved through the Solomon Islands. The latest system to be classified as a Category 5 severe tropical cyclone was Cyclone Niran, which was classified on March 5, 2021, before it made landfall on New Caledonia.

Background
The South Pacific tropical cyclone basin is located to the south of the Equator between 160°E and 120°W. The basin is officially monitored by the Fiji Meteorological Service (FMS) and the New Zealand MetService who are the primary warning centres for the region. Other meteorological services such as the Australian Bureau of Meteorology (BoM), Météo-France (MF) as well as the United States Joint Typhoon Warning Center (JTWC) and the National Weather Service also monitor the basin. Within the basin this scale is only officially used in American Samoa, however, systems are commonly compared to the SSHWS using 1-minute sustained windspeeds from the United States Joint Typhoon Warning Center. On both scales, a Category 5 tropical cyclone is expected to cause widespread devastation, if it significantly impacts land at or near its peak intensity. 

Before the formal start of the satellite era during the 1969-70 season, there was no way of determining how intense a tropical cyclone was unless it impacted land or either a ship or a plane happened to observe it.

Over the years, the intensity estimates of tropical cyclones have been reanalysed for various reasons and were found to have been underestimated by the various warning centres.

There is not enough evidence available to make definitive conclusions about how climate change is impacting Category 5 severe tropical cyclones, however, tropical cyclones are generally expected to become stronger and more frequent in the future.

Systems

|-
| Hina ||  ||  ||  || Solomon Islands, Vanuatu, Fiji ||  ||  ||
|-
| Fran ||  ||  ||  || Wallis and Futuna, Fiji, VanuatuNew Caledonia, Queensland, New Zealand ||  ||  ||
|-
| Ron ||  ||  ||  || Samoan Islands, Wallis and Futuna, Tonga ||  ||  ||
|-
| Susan ||  ||  ||  || Solomon Islands, Vanuatu, Fiji |||  ||  ||
|-
| Zoe ||  ||  ||  || Solomon Islands, Vanuatu, Fiji || Severe ||  ||
|-
| Beni ||  ||  ||  || Solomon Islands, VanuatuNew Caledonia, Australia ||  || 1 ||
|-
| Dovi ||  ||  ||  || Niue, Cook Islands || Minimal ||  ||
|-
| Erica ||  ||  ||  || Queensland, Solomon IslandsVanuatu, New Caledonia ||  || 2 ||
|-
| Heta ||  ||  ||  || Samoan Islands, Niue, Tonga, Wallis and Futuna ||  ||  ||
|-
| Meena ||  ||  ||  || Cook Islands ||  ||  ||
|-
| Olaf ||  ||  ||  || Samoan Islands, Cook Islands ||  ||  ||
|-
| Percy ||  ||  ||  || Tokelau, Samoan Islands, Cook Islands ||  ||  ||
|-
| Ului ||  ||  ||  || Solomon Islands, Vanuatu || Unknown || 1 ||
|-
| Ian ||  ||  ||  || Fiji, Tonga ||  || 1 ||
|-
| Pam ||  ||  ||  || Fiji, Kiribati, Solomon Islands, TuvaluVanuatu, New Caledonia, New Zealand ||  || 16 ||
|-
| Winston ||  ||  ||  || Vanuatu, Fiji, Tonga, Niue ||  || 44 ||
|-
| Donna ||  ||  ||  || Melanesia, New Zealand ||  || 2 ||
|-
| Gita ||  ||  ||  || Solomon Islands, Vanuatu, Fiji, NiueWallis and Futuna, Samoan Islands, Tonga ||  || 2 ||
|-
| Harold ||  ||  ||  || Solomon Islands, Vanuatu, Fiji, Tonga || Significant ||  ||
|-
| Yasa ||  ||  ||  || Fiji, Tonga || Significant ||  ||
|-
| Niran ||  ||  ||  || Queensland, New Caledonia || Extensive || ||
|-
| Kevin ||  ||  ||  || Solomon Islands, Vanuatu, New Caledonia || || ||
|}

Other systems
This made it equivalent to a Category 5 hurricane on the SSHWS; however, the FMS estimated that the system had peaked with 10-minute sustained winds of  based on the Dvorak technique, which made it a Category 4 severe tropical cyclone on the Australian scale. Elsewhere in the South Pacific Ocean, Severe Tropical Cyclones: Dominic (1982), Elinor (1983), Kathy (1984), Harry (1989), Aivu (1989), Rewa (1993-94), Theodore (1994), Monica (2006), Hamish (2009), Yasi (2011), Ita (2014), Marcia (2015) were each considered to be a Category 5 severe tropical cyclone by the BoM while located in the Australian region. During a database repair project that took place between 2005 and 2007, the BoM discovered that Severe Tropical Cyclone Pam 1974 had been reanalysed at some point after 1979. This reanalysis showed that Pam had moved into the Australian region as a category 5 severe tropical cyclone, however, during 2021 it was determined that the width of Pam's southern eyewall was too narrow at this time and the BoM downgraded it to a Category 4 severe tropical cyclone.

During 2014, Meteo France's French Polynesian Meteorological Centre and RSMC La Reunion published the results of a reanalysis, they had undertaken into Severe Tropical Cyclone's Nisha-Orama and Veena of the 1982-83 season. During 2017, a study into extreme tropical cyclone activity in the southern Pacific Ocean was published in the Royal Meteorological Society's International Journal of Climatology. Within the study, the authors reanalysed satellite images of several tropical cyclones between 1980 - 2016 using the 1984 Dvorak Technique and found that 18 tropical cyclones had reached Category 5 intensity on the Saffir-Simpson hurricane wind scale.

Land interaction
Off the 22 Category 5 severe tropical cyclones listed above, only Severe Tropical Cyclones: Fran, Beni, Erica, Ului, Pam, Winston, Harold, Yasa and Kevin are considered to have made landfall on a Pacific nation. Severe Tropical Cyclone's Pam, Winston, Harold and Yasa are the only systems to have made landfall while at Category 5 intensity and were considered to have caused widespread devastation to Fiji and Vanuatu. Erica directly impacted New Caledonia as a Category 5 severe tropical cyclone, however, it had markedly weakened, before it made landfall on New Caledonia's main island.

Severe Tropical Cyclone's Fran, Beni and Ului all made landfall on Queensland, Australia. In addition to these six systems making landfall, several systems have either threatened or passed very near to various smaller islands at their peak intensity. In particular, Fran passed in between the islands of Efate and Erromango in Vanuatu during March 9, 1992 while Susan threatened Vanuatu during January 5, 1998, but recurved in time to spare the island nation a direct hit. At around 18:00 UTC on January 6, 1998, Severe Tropical Cyclone Ron passed within  of the Tongan island of Niuafo'ou. Severe Tropical Cyclone Zoe passed near or over several of the Solomon Islands within Temotu Province during December 2002.

During 2020, Cyclone Harold made landfall on northern Vanuatu as a Category 5 severe tropical cyclone, before later impacting Fiji and Tonga as a Category 4 severe tropical cyclone. Severe Tropical Cyclone Niran subsequently skirted the coast of New Caledonia as it weakened into a Category 3 Severe Tropical Cyclone.

See also

List of Category 5 Atlantic hurricanes
List of Category 5 Pacific hurricanes

References

External links

South Pacific